Milton is an unincorporated community in Atchison County, in the U.S. state of Missouri.

History
A post office called Milton was established in 1877, and remained in operation until 1908. The origin of the name Milton is obscure.

References

Unincorporated communities in Atchison County, Missouri
Unincorporated communities in Missouri